Six ships operated by the Lykes Brothers Steamship Co have carried the name Almeria Lykes
 , purchased 1922, sold 1940
 , managed for USMC 1940–41, and again in 1942. Sunk during Operation Pedestal
 , managed for USMC, scrapped 1971
 , a Type C8 transferred to Military Sealift Command in 1986 and renamed USNS Cape May
 , originally SS President McKinley
 , chartered out as President Buchanan, off charter 1996 and renamed Almeria Lykes, renamed Lykes Navigator in 1998, sold 2005 to CP Ships and renamed CP Navigator, transferred to Hapag-Lloyd as the Oslo Express and eventually scrapped

References

Ship names